KVER (branded as "Radio Manantial") is an FM Spanish language religious radio station that serves the El Paso, Texas, area. It is owned by the World Radio Network.

External links
KVER official website

VER (FM)